Direct presidential elections were held in Yemen for the first time on 23 September 1999. Candidates had to be approved by at least 10% of the 301 members of the House of Representatives; however, in practice this meant that only two parties, the ruling General People's Congress (GPC) and Al-Islah had enough seats to nominate their candidates. However, al-Islah backed the GPC candidate, incumbent President Ali Abdullah Saleh rather than running a candidate of their own.

The only candidates that received approval from Parliament were Saleh and Najeeb Qahtan Al-Sha'abi, another member of the GPC. The main opposition candidate, Ali Saleh Obad of the Yemeni Socialist Party, failed to gain enough support in the House of Representatives; his party subsequently boycotted the elections. The reported voter turnout of 67.5% was contested by the opposition.

Nominations
Nominations for presidential candidates closed on 13 July 1999. In total, 31 candidates put their names forward, though three of them were disqualified immediately for failing to meet the legal requirements:

Ali Abdullah Saleh – supported by the General People's Congress, Al-Islah, National Opposition Council) 
Ali Salih 'Ubad Muqbil – supported by parties in the Supreme Co-ordination Council for the Opposition
Abd al-Quwi Ahmad Hamoud Shuwi'a – supported by the People's Democratic Party
Al-Habbani Muhammad abd al-Malik Nu'man al-'Abassi – supported by the Yemeni Popular Unity Party
Ali bin Ali Sabihi
Muhammad Muhammad Hizam al-Yamani 
Amin Ahmad Thabit 
Abd al-Wahhab Muhammad Hassan al-Karidi 
Abdullah Salih Salih al-Bakhiti
Muhammad Ahmad Sa'ad al-Dhufari
Faisal Ali Ahmad Ghaaithan al-Tawil 
Salih Hassan Abdullah al-'Azani 
Abd al-Malik Yahya Ahmad Hanash 
Ahmad Ali Hussein Yahya al-'Amri 
Muhammad A'id Qa'id al-'Uthmali 
Ali Salih al-Houri
Muhammad Ali Muhsin al-Sirri 
Salih Ahmad bin Ahmad Jubah 
Muhammad Hussein al-Jamuzi 
Ali Abdullah Salih Muhsin Suroub 
Abd al-Wahhab Qanaf Sha'if 
Mustafa Youssef Khalil 
Iskandar Ali al-Nathari
Mustafa Ali Naji 'Aiyash
Ahmad Muslih al-Barti 
Ma'adh Abdullah al-Shahani 
Ahmad Abduh al-Ramim 
Najeeb Qahtan Al-Sha'abi – MP for the General People's Congress, running as an independent

The following were disqualified:
Amin Ahmad bin Ahmad Thabit (candidates must not be married to a foreigner and he had a Russian wife) 
Abdullah Salih Salih Muhsin Surub (minimum age is 40, he was 38)
A candidate with a name too similar to President Saleh

The parliamentary vetting committee eliminated another four candidates, putting 24 of the 31 nominations to a parliamentary vote, in which a candidate required 31 votes to be able to run in the elections. Another candidate, Khalid al-Zarraka, did not appear on the publicised list of nominations, but was included in the parliamentary vote. Only two candidates managed to obtain the required number of votes; Saleh and Najeeb Qahtan Al-Sha'abi. Twenty-one of the 25 candidates (including al-Zarraka) did not receive any votes.

Results

References

Presidential elections in Yemen
Yemen
1999 in Yemen